A year of three popes is a year when the College of Cardinals of the Catholic Church is required to elect two new popes within the same calendar year. Such a year generally occurs when a newly elected pope dies or resigns very early into his papacy. This results in the Catholic Church being led by three different popes during the same calendar year. In one instance, in 1276, there was a year of four popes.

Instances
The most recent instance of a year of three popes occurred in 1978. The three popes involved were:
 Paul VI, who was elected on 21 June 1963 and died on 6 August 1978.
 John Paul I, who was elected on 26 August 1978 and died thirty-three days later on 28 September 1978.
 John Paul II, who was elected on 16 October 1978 and held the position until his death 26 years, 5 months, and 18 days later on 2 April 2005.
There have been thirteen instances in which exactly three popes have held office in a given calendar year. Years in which the Roman Catholic Church was led by three different popes include:
827: Eugene II — Valentine — Gregory IV  (Valentine was Pope for just 41 days when he died.)
896: Formosus — Boniface VI — Stephen VI (After a pontificate of fifteen days, Boniface is said by some to have died of the gout or forcibly ejected)
897: Stephen VI — Romanus — Theodore II (Pontificate of Romanus ended when he was deposed and confined to a monastery.)
928: John X — Leo VI — Stephen VII
964: Leo VIII — Benedict V — John XIII (First Leo was overthrown, then Benedict himself was overthrown) 
1003: Sylvester II — John XVII — John XVIII
1045: Sylvester III — Benedict IX (second reign) — Gregory VI
1187: Urban III — Gregory VIII — Clement III
1503: Alexander VI — Pius III — Julius II
1555: Julius III — Marcellus II — Paul IV
1590: Sixtus V — Urban VII — Gregory XIV
1605: Clement VIII — Leo XI — Paul V
1978: Paul VI — John Paul I — John Paul II

There was also a year in which the Roman Catholic Church was led by four popes, called the Year of Four Popes:

1276: Gregory X — Innocent V — Adrian V — John XXI

See also

List of popes by length of reign
Western Schism, which from 1409 to 1414 saw three simultaneous claimants to the Papacy
Year of the Three Kings
Year of the Three Emperors
Year of three prime ministers

Notes

References

Footnotes

Bibliography

History of the papacy